Marcelo Henrique dos Santos (born 1 November 1969), commonly known as Marcelo Henrique, is a former Brazilian footballer.

Career statistics

Club

Notes

References

1969 births
Living people
Brazilian footballers
Brazil youth international footballers
Association football forwards
Fluminense FC players
Sport Club Internacional players
Bangu Atlético Clube players
Clube Atlético Bragantino players
Itaperuna Esporte Clube players
Associação Atlética Ponte Preta players
Macaé Esporte Futebol Clube players
Footballers from Rio de Janeiro (city)